Salim Ghazi Saeedi (also Romanized as Salim Ghāzi Saeedi and Salim Ghāzi-Saeedi; born 1981) is an Iranian composer and guitarist who plays a variety of genres ranging from progressive metal, jazz fusion, avant-garde classical chamber, progressive surf, progressive rock, RIO (Rock in Opposition), to art rock with a minimalist approach.

Biography
Saeedi was born in 1981 in Tehran, Iran. He began teaching himself to play guitar in 1999. He has composed three albums with the band Arashk: Abrahadabra (2006), Sovereign (2007), and Ustuqus-al-Uss (2008). He subsequently released the solo albums Iconophobic (2010), Human Encounter (2011), and namoWoman (2012). The albums were entirely self-produced, with Saeedi laying down guitar and keyboards, drum arrangements, and mixing.
On namoWoman, he incorporates Persian microtonal music influences.

Some critics have compared his sound to Univers Zero, Art Zoyd, John Zorn, Patrick O'Hearn, Mike Oldfield, Djam Karet, Birdsongs of the Mesozoic, David Bedford, Richard Pinhas, ZNR, Mecano, Present, Aranis, the entire Belgian chamber rock scene, Dick Dale, Anne Dudley, Jaz Coleman, and X-Legged Sally.

Some progressive rock publications have also compared his music to King Crimson and Robert Fripp.

Discography

Solo
 Iconophobic (2010)
 Human Encounter (2011)
 namoWoman (2012)
 United Ubiquity of Flesh (2017)

with Arashk
 Abrahadabra (2006)
 Sovereign (2007)
 Ustuqus-al-Uss (2008)
 Yell (2008)

Collaborations
 "When There Is More Beauty in the Contrary" – Negar Bouban & Salim Ghazi Saeedi (2011)

References

External links
 

Progressive rock guitarists
Jazz fusion musicians
Art rock musicians
Progressive metal guitarists
Iranian composers
Rock in Opposition
Minimalist composers
Iranian guitarists
Lead guitarists
1981 births
Living people
People from Tehran
Microtonal musicians
21st-century guitarists